Michael Bucci (born June 5, 1972) is an American retired professional wrestler. Bucci is best known for his appearances in Extreme Championship Wrestling (ECW) as Nova, Super Nova, and "Hollywood" Nova and World Wrestling Entertainment (WWE) as Simon Dean.

Professional wrestling career

Early career (1992–1995) 
Bucci was trained in professional wrestling by Mike Sharpe, and debuted in 1992, wrestling on the independent circuit. In late 1993, Bucci made several appearances in the World Wrestling Federation, wrestling in tag team matches against the Steiner Brothers and the Headshrinkers on Monday Night Raw.

Extreme Championship Wrestling

Blue World Order (1996–1998)

In 1996, Bucci debuted in Extreme Championship Wrestling (ECW) as Super Nova (later shortened to Nova), utilizing a superhero character. He made his ECW debut at Hostile City Showdown against El Puerto Riqueño, with the match ending in a no contest due to outside interference by The Eliminators. He was later paired with Raven, Stevie Richards, and The Blue Meanie as part of the Raven's Nest faction. Nova would often pair with Richards and Meanie to imitate rock bands such as KISS and The Jackson 5.

Bucci, along with Richards, asked permission from both Raven and Paul Heyman to parody the New World Order (nWo); it was granted, and Bucci was given credit with the creation of The Blue World Order (bWo) logo. Bucci parodied Hollywood Hogan as Hollywood Nova, Richards became "Big Stevie Cool" (a takeoff on Kevin Nash's nickname of "Big Daddy Cool"), and Meanie was "Da Blue Guy", a takeoff on Scott Hall, "The Bad Guy". bWo debuted at November to Remember where they helped Richards in defeating David Tyler Morton Jericho. Many other members were added and removed between 1996 and 1998 before the team split in the latter. bWo would become popular with the fans turning into fan favorites and leaving Raven's Nest in the process.

Richards left the bWo to return to Raven's Nest, and Nova and Meanie continued to team together as a tag team. On the July 17, 1997 episode of Hardcore TV, Nova unsuccessfully challenged Taz for the World Television Championship. bWo feuded with the much larger stable Full Blooded Italians throughout 1998, defeating them at Wrestlepalooza. In the fall of the year, bWo entered a rivalry with Danny Doring and Roadkill, defeating them at November to Remember.

Teaming and feuding with Chris Chetti (1999–2001)
After Meanie left the company, Bucci changed his gimmick, becoming Super Nova, and adopting a more serious personality. He would start wearing wrestling attires based in the suits of comic book characters like The Flash, Green Lantern and Venom. He formed a tag team with Chris Chetti as the two challenged Dudley Boyz for the World Tag Team Championship on numerous occasions but failed to win the titles. At Living Dangerously, Nova teamed with Spike Dudley to defeat the Dudley Boyz. Nova defeated Rod Price at Cyberslam. Chetti and Nova also simultaneously feuded with Danny Doring and Roadkill, trading wins at Hostile City Showdown and Heat Wave. At Anarchy Rulz, Nova and Chetti fought Simon Diamond and Tony DeVito to a no contest. At November to Remember, Nova lost to Little Guido.
u
The rivalry with Doring and Roadkill continued into 2000 as the team of Nova, Jazz and Kid Kash lost to Doring, Roadkill and Diamond in a six-person tag team match. At Living Dangerously, Chetti and Nova defeated Jado and Gedo in a tag team match. At Cyberslam, Nova and Jazz lost to Dawn Marie and Lance Storm at Cyberslam. At Hardcore Heaven, Chetti and Nova defeated Doring and Roadkill and Da Baldies (Angel and Tony DeVito) in a three-way dance. At Heat Wave, Chetti and Nova defeated Da Baldies. At the night one of Midtown Massacre, Chetti and Nova participated in a tournament for the vacant World Tag Team Championship, losing to Tap Out (Simon Diamond and Johnny Swinger) in the opening round. At the night two of the event, Chetti and Nova competed against Danny Doring and Roadkill and Tap Out in a three-way dance, where Chetti turned on Nova by hitting him with a chair causing them to get eliminated and breaking up the team. It marked the beginning of a heated rivalry between the two men, with Nova beating his former partner in a match where the loser was fired at November to Remember.

After Chetti's departure, Nova feuded with Hot Commodity (Julio Dinero, E. Z. Money and Chris Hamrick), wrestling Hot Commodity members Julio Dinero at Massacre on 34th Street, E. Z. Money at Holiday Hell and Chris Hamrick at ECW's final pay-per-view event Guilty as Charged on January 7, 2001. At the second to last ECW event in Poplar Bluff, Missouri, he was named as Danny Doring's substitute tag team partner (filling in for Amish Roadkill) to help defend the World Tag Team Championship against Hot Commodity; Doring and Nova successfully defended the titles. His final match for ECW took place on January 13 where he defeated Tom Marquez.

Independent circuit and overseas (2001–2002)
When ECW went out of business, Bucci, as Nova, became more active on the independent scene until 2003. Nova wrestled in various promotions such as California's Ultimate Pro Wrestling, and New Jersey's Phoenix Championship Wrestling, the latter of which was founded by his brother Don Bucci. During this time, he formed a successful tag team with Frankie Kazarian known as Evolution (not to be confused with the World Wrestling Entertainment stable of the same name). In most of the promotions they competed for, they were successful in becoming tag team champions. He also briefly wrestled in the short-lived Australia-based World Wrestling All-Stars, where he feuded with A.J. Styles amongst other cruiserweights for the promotion's International Cruiserweight Championship, which he was unable to win before the company folded. In late 2001, he also worked a number of shows in England.

World Wrestling Entertainment (2002–2007)
In April 2002, Bucci signed a developmental contract with World Wrestling Entertainment (WWE) and was assigned to Ohio Valley Wrestling (OVW). In his OVW debut, he defeated The Prototype for the OVW Heavyweight Championship. He held the title for several months, retaining it in matches against The Prototype, Christian, Lance Cade, and Chris Kanyon, before he lost it to The Damaja in October. The following year, he formed a tag team with Aaron Stevens, and the duo defeated Tank Toland and Chris Cage to win the OVW Tag Team Championship. In June 2004, Bucci was named the assistant booker of OVW. It was around this time that he was called up to start competing in SmackDown! dark matches and on Velocity.

He then began to try out a fitness-expert gimmick using the ring name Simon Dean. The name was inspired by Dean Malenko's real name, Dean Simon. In August 2004, a series of introductory promos about the "Simon System" (a program of diet, exercise, and supplements) were aired on WWE television. The promos parodied fitness infomercials, with Dean routinely insulting his supposed customers. During this gimmick, he acted as the sponsor of Raw, occasionally wrestling after first insulting the fitness of the crowd and the area in which they were located. After making only a minor impact on the Raw brand, he formed a tag team with Maven who supposedly was a user of the "Simon System". With still only a minor impact made, Bucci was traded to the SmackDown! brand on June 30, 2005.

During a WWE produced ECW pay-per-view, ECW One Night Stand, Bucci returned as Hollywood Nova with Da Blue Guy and Big Stevie Cool as the bWo. During the event, Joey Styles made a reference to his "Simon Dean" character. After Bucci was hit with two chairs, Styles said, "That's more painful than having to be Simon Dean on national TV".

When Bucci moved to SmackDown! as part of the draft lottery, he joined the other members of the bWo and appeared as "Hollywood" Nova for his first appearance on the show. His next appearance for the brand was wrestling on its sister show, Velocity, as Simon Dean. The general belief was that the bWo appearance was going to be a one off, meaning Bucci would keep to his "health sponsor" gimmick. It was announced, however, that the bWo would participate in a 6-man tag match at The Great American Bash against The Mexicools (Juventud, Psicosis, and Super Crazy). The announcement of this match occurred on the same edition of SmackDown! that Bucci's Simon Dean character had a match with Booker T. At the Great American Bash, the bWo lost to the Mexicools in the six-man tag team match. The appearance of the bWo soon faded as The Blue Meanie wasn't staying with the company and Richards began returning to his previous heel gimmick while Bucci continued with the Simon Dean persona.

In late August, Dean began coming to the ring on the Dean Machine (a Segway PT type machine). He would also force feed "Simon System" products to jobbers who wouldn't accept his offer to try them after defeating them in squash matches. On the September 1 episode of SmackDown!, he faced Batista whom he claimed to be a user of his products. Dean had his first major WWE pay-per-view appearance at No Mercy, in a loss against Bobby Lashley. After the match, Lashley forced Dean to eat 20 double cheeseburgers, causing him to vomit backstage. Dean had been noted on his later appearances as the "Head of SmackDown!s welcoming committee", a position in which he was used as a jobber to debuting wrestlers.

During the January 6, 2006 episode of SmackDown!, Dean came to the ring and challenged any tag team. Paul London and Brian Kendrick answered the challenge, only to be brutally attacked by Gymini (Jake and Jesse), two alleged users of The Simon System. Dean was the third entrant in the 2006 Royal Rumble but was eliminated quickly by match-starters Triple H and Rey Mysterio. Dean began managing Gymini, but the team soon faded off television after Jesse suffered an injury in May 2006 and Dean went back to jobbing to other superstars.

In August 2006, Bucci took over from Tommy Dreamer as a talent development manager in OVW. On August 31, 2007 Bucci parted ways with WWE.

Return to the independent circuit (2009–present)
On April 18, 2009, Bucci, as Hollywood Nova, along with many other ECW alumni appeared at One Pro Wrestling's "To The Extreme" weekend event, where he teamed with the Blue Meanie for his first in-ring performances in nearly 3 years. They unsuccessfully challenged Project Ego (Kris Travis and Martin Kirby) for the 1PW Tag Team Championship. Bucci has since wrestled for both 1PW and International Wrestling Cartel.

On June 27, 2009, Bucci, again as Hollywood Nova appeared with many other former ECW talent at the Francine Fournier-run benefit show entitled Legends of The Arena at the original ECW Arena in South Philadelphia. He accompanied the Blue Meanie to the ring where they as the Blue World Order defeated the team of Little Guido and Big Sal the Full Blooded Italians. On August 8, 2010, Bucci took part in Total Nonstop Action Wrestling's ECW reunion show, Hardcore Justice, where he, as Hollywood Nova, accompanied Stevie Richards to the ring and later attacked Tommy Dreamer during his match with Raven.

Bucci appeared in the "On the Spot Title Shot" Battle Royal for Pro Wrestling Syndicate in March 2015 where he reunited with BWO stablemates Stevie Richards and the Blue Meanie. The three also appeared at Pro Wrestling Syndicate's Supercard show on June 6, 2015 as part of Mick Foley's 50th Birthday Celebration. On September 4, 2015, Hollywood Nova, Big Stevie Cool, and Da Blue Guy reunited as the Blue World Order for Chikara's 2015 King of Trios tournament. They were eliminated from the tournament in their first round match by the Devastation Corporation (Blaster McMassive, Flex Rumblecrunch and Max Smashmaster). During the third night of the tournament, Bucci worked a tag team match under his Simon Dean gimmick.

Personal life
He is the twin brother of Phoenix Championship Wrestling promoter and founder Don "Donnie B." Bucci. After retiring in 2007, Bucci began working as a licensed Mortgage broker throughout the United States.

Championships and accomplishmentsAmerican Wrestling CouncilAWC Heavyweight Championship (1 time)Border City WrestlingBCW Can-Am Tag Team Championship (1 time) – with Tommy DreamerCarolina Wrestling SyndicateCWS Tag Team Championship (1 time) – with The Blue MeanieEast Coast Wrestling AllianceECWA Tag Team Championship (1 time) – with Frankie KazarianGarden State Wrestling AllianceGSWA Heavyweight Championship (1 time)Great Lakes WrestlingGLW World Heavyweight Championship (1 time)NWA Northeast WrestlingNWA Northeast Light Heavyweight Championship (1 time)Northeast WrestlingNEW Light Heavyweight Championship (1 time)New Jack City WrestlingNJCW Heavyweight Championship (1 time)
NJCW Tag Team Championship (1 time) – with Rico CasanovaOhio Valley WrestlingOVW Heavyweight Championship (1 time)
OVW Southern Tag Team Championship (1 time) – with Aaron StevensPhoenix Championship WrestlingPCW Tag Team Championship (1 time) – with Frankie Kazarian
Russ Haas Memorial Tag Team Tournament (2002) – with R.C. HaasPremier Wrestling Federation / Pennsylvania Wrestling FederationPWF Universal Heavyweight Championship (1 time)Pro Wrestling Illustrated''PWI ranked him #88 of the 500 best singles wrestlers in the PWI 500 in 2005Steel City WrestlingSCW Tag Team Championship (1 time) – with The Blue MeanieUltimate Pro WrestlingUPW Tag Team Championship (1 time) – with Frankie Kazarian
UPW Tag Team Championship Tournament (2001) – with Frankie KazarianWorld Wide Wrestling AllianceWWWA Light Heavyweight Championship (1 time)XCW Wrestling Mid-West'''
XCW Mid-West Heavyweight Championship (1 time)

References

External links 
 

1972 births
20th-century professional wrestlers
21st-century professional wrestlers
American male professional wrestlers
The Blue World Order members
Identical twins
Living people
People from Toms River, New Jersey
Professional wrestlers from New Jersey
Professional wrestling trainers
American twins
Twin sportspeople
OVW Heavyweight Champions